Esta noche mejor no is a 1965 Argentine comedy film directed by Julio Saraceni.

Cast
  Teresa Blasco
  Roberto Escalada
  Fernando Siro
  Ubaldo Martínez
  Beba Bidart
  Nelly Panizza
  Lalo Hartich

References

External links
 

1965 films
1960s Spanish-language films
Argentine black-and-white films
Films directed by Julio Saraceni
1960s Argentine films